Kalligramma is a prehistoric genus of winged insects in the family Kalligrammatidae.

Species
 Kalligramma albifasciatum Yang et al., 2014
 Kalligramma brachyrhyncha Yang et al., 2014
 Kalligramma circularia Yang et al., 2014
 Kalligramma delicatum Liu et al., 2015
 Kalligramma elegans Yang et al., 2014
 Kalligramma flexuosum Panfilov, 1968
 Kalligramma haeckeli Walther, 1904
 Kalligramma jurarchegonium Zhang and Zhang, 2003
 Kalligramma liaoningense Ren and Guo, 1996
 Kalligramma multinerve Panfilov, 1968
 Kalligramma paradoxum Liu et al., 2014
 Kalligramma sharovi Panfilov, 1968

References

Mesozoic insects of Europe
Prehistoric insect genera
Neuroptera